Tejuosho Market is an ultramodern market located along the Ojuelegba-Itire Road in Yaba, Lagos, Lagos State, Nigeria. The market which is divided into two phases (Phase I and Phase II) contains about 2,383 lock-up shops in a sprawling four-storey building and about 1,251 K-clamps units, banking spaces, 14 food court spaces, eight lifts, two escalators connecting the four floors, 600 parking lots and basic facilities like stable electricity and water supply, equipped fire station, two rams to assist the physically challenged and a crèche.

Some years after a fire incident that destroyed most part of the market, the Lagos State Government, Stormberg Engineering Limited, and First Bank of Nigeria in a public-private partnership reconstructed the market into a mega shopping plaza as part of plans to turn Lagos into a "Mega City".

Criticism
Tejuosho market was a middle class conventional market where commodities were sold at a cut-price. The hike in price of stalls after the market was reconstructed has left operators who earn relatively low-income criticizing the state government for its involvement of the private sector into the reconstruction of the market.

See also
 List of markets in Lagos

References

Retail markets in Lagos
Buildings and structures in Lagos
Yaba, Lagos